Waqdariya (Waqddariya, Waqdariye, Waaq-Dariya, Waqderia) is a coastal village in the Sanaag region of Somaliland.

Recent history
In 1951, Waqdariya is listed in a book published in England under the name "Waqderia" as the coordinates 11°06′N 47°45 E. The inhabitants are mentioned as Musa Ismail of Habar Yoonis , Nub Omr of Warsangeli.

In 1956, A report entitled The Geology of the Heis-Mait-Waqderia Area, Erigavo District, Somaliland Protectorate Geological Survey was written by Mason et al.

In December 2008, it was reported that pirates of the coast of Somalia was planning to build a base in the western part of Las Khorey, including Waqdariya and Gelweita.

In June 2012, Mayor Las Khorey announced in an interview with Somalia Report that they had deployed youth from Badhan, Dhahar, Hingalol, and El Buh in Laso-surad and Waqdariya to prepare for attacks from Somaliland Marines.

In April 2014, it was reported that there are Metamorphic rock containing ruby and sapphire in Waqdariya.

In November 2019, a deadly battle broke out over a gold deposit found several years ago near Waqdariya. Regarding this incident, Badhan elders accused the Somaliland government of instigating the violence.

In April 2020, the Nuux Cumar clan of Warsangali recaptured Waqdariya, which had been occupied by the Muuse Ismaaciil clan of Habar Yoonis. The Somaliland government has deployed troops in the area to prevent further clashes. Al Jazeera reported that it was a fight between militias over grazing land. Somaliland's Minister of Justice accused the diaspora of being behind the fighting.

Demographic
It is inhabited by the Urursuge clan of habar yoonis and the Jibriil Siciid clan of Warsangali.

References

Populated places in Sanaag
Cities in Somaliland